is a railway station operated by East Japan Railway Company (JR East) in Tsurumi-ku, Yokohama, Kanagawa Prefecture, Japan.

Lines

Station layout

Anzen Station has an island platform serving two tracks.

Platforms

History
A station for passenger services named  was opened on 28 October 1930, adjacent to the freight station. The Tsurumi Rinkō line was nationalized on 1 July 1943, at which time the two stations were unified under its present name, and was later absorbed into the Japan National Railways (JNR) network. The station has been unstaffed since 1 March 1971. Upon the privatization of the JNR on 1 April 1987, the station has been operated by JR East.

Surrounding area
 US Navy Tsurumi Fuel Terminal

References
 Harris, Ken and Clarke, Jackie. Jane's World Railways 2008-2009. Jane's Information Group (2008).

External links

 JR East Anzen Station